Men's Combined World Cup 2005/2006

Calendar

Three "Super Combined" and one original combined event were held.

Final point standings

In Men's Combined World Cup 2005/06 all results count.

The event at Kitzbühel saw no more finishers.

Men's Combined Team Results

bold indicate highest score - italics indicate race wins

References
 fis-ski.com

World Cup
FIS Alpine Ski World Cup men's combined discipline titles